Mateus Shkreta (born 16 April 1994 in Tirana) is an Albanian footballer who currently plays as a forward.

Club career
As a youth player, he played for Czech sides Sparta Prague and FK Teplice.

References

External links
 Profile - FSHF

1994 births
Living people
Footballers from Tirana
Albanian footballers
Association football forwards
Albania youth international footballers
Albania under-21 international footballers
AC Sparta Prague players
FK Teplice players
PAS Giannina F.C. players
KS Kastrioti players
Kategoria e Parë players
Albanian expatriate footballers
Expatriate footballers in the Czech Republic
Albanian expatriate sportspeople in the Czech Republic
Expatriate footballers in Greece
Albanian expatriate sportspeople in Greece